Karen Hargrave (née Hutcheson, born 23 September 1965) is a retired Scottish middle and long-distance runner. She finished fourth in the 3000 metres at the 1990 Commonwealth Games for Scotland, and finished seventh in the 1500 metres representing Great Britain at the 1989 IAAF World Indoor Championships.

Career
Hutcheson, who was a member of Pitreavie AAC, finished third in the 800 metres at the 1986 and 1987 AAA Indoor Championships and third in the 1500 metres at the 1987 UK Championships. In 1989, she won the AAA Indoor Championship 1500 metres title, and went on to finish seventh in the 1500 metres at both the 1989 European Indoor Championships and the 1989 World Indoor Championships.

Hutcheson finished second to Liz McColgan in the 3000 metres at the 1989 UK Championships in June, running 9:00.61, before achieving her lifetime best for the 1500 metres with 4:09.46 on 4 September in Budapest. She went on to have perhaps her best career result at the Commonwealth Games in January 1990. In a race won by the Canadian Angela Chalmers, she improved her personal best by almost 12 seconds, running 8:48.72, to finish fourth behind Scottish teammates Yvonne Murray and McColgan. She also finished tenth in the 1500 metres final. A month after the Commonwealth Games, she competed at the European Indoor Championships in Glasgow, where she failed to finish in the 3000 metres.

Hutcheson finished third in the 3000 metres at the 1991 UK Championships, and competing as Karen Hargrave, ran a 5 km road best of 16:13 in London in 1995.

International competitions

References

1965 births
Living people
Scottish female middle-distance runners
Scottish female long-distance runners
Commonwealth Games competitors for Scotland
Athletes (track and field) at the 1990 Commonwealth Games